Kinning Park subway station serves the Kinning Park area of Glasgow, Scotland. However, to reach Kinning Park, a footbridge is provided across the M8.

It was opened in 1896 and comprehensively modernised in 1977–1980. The station retains its original island platform configuration.

Kinning Park station is the shallowest in the Subway system.

The station is lightly used and recorded only 240,000 boardings in the 12 months ending March 2005.

New ticket barriers came into operation on 10 July 2013.

Past passenger numbers 
 2004/05: 0.240 million annually
 2011/12: 0.237 million annually

References

Glasgow Subway stations
Railway stations in Great Britain opened in 1896
Govan
Kinning Park